The 2005 Valencian Community motorcycle Grand Prix was the last round of the 2005 MotoGP Championship. It took place on the weekend of 4–6 November 2005 at the Circuit Ricardo Tormo.

Race

This race featured a battle between Marco Melandri and Nicky Hayden, and a fightback to third place from a bad qualifying from Valentino Rossi, who by then was already crowned world champion.

Before the start of the weekend, the Factory Yamaha Team had unveiled a special, one-off 'retro' livery to commemorate Yamaha's fiftieth anniversary and their very successful year in racing, replacing their main sponsor and its colours (Gauloises and dark blue) with the traditional white with red and black blocks/stripes. They ran a similar livery before at the United States round but that livery consisted of yellow instead of white.

After sixteen rounds, Valentino Rossi has already won the title at the Malaysian round. Rossi has since then increased his title lead to 351 points. Second is Marco Melandri with 195 points and a close third is Nicky Hayden with 186 points.

On Saturday, Sete Gibernau clinched his the final pole position of the season - his fifth - with a time of 1:31.874. Second is Marco Melandri who is +0.237 seconds behind and third is Nicky Hayden who is +0.343 seconds behind. The second row of the grid consists out of Carlos Checa in fourth place, Max Biaggi in fifth place and Colin Edwards in sixth place. World champion Valentino Rossi had a poor qualifying result after a crash and starts a lowly fifteenth. Suzuki test rider Nobuatsu Aoki replaces Kenny Roberts Jr. who is still recovering from a broken left wrist he sustained after a big highside during Friday practice at the Australian round, having then also confirmed his split with the team shortly after.

MotoGP classification

250 cc classification

125 cc classification

Championship standings after the race (motoGP)

Below are the standings for the top five riders and constructors after round seventeen has concluded.

Riders' Championship standings

Constructors' Championship standings

 Note: Only the top five positions are included for both sets of standings.

References

Valencian Community motorcycle Grand Prix
Valencian
Valencian Motorcycle Grand Prix
21st century in Valencia